Delvin Allen Topoll (born October 21, 1933) is a former Canadian professional ice hockey player. Topoll played in over 1,000 games in the Western Hockey League and Quebec Hockey League and registered 269 goals and 555 assists for a total of 824 points in an 18-year pro hockey career.

Awards and achievements
MJHL First All-Star Team (1952)
MJHL Scoring Champion (1952)
Turner Cup  (IHL) Championship (1953)
"Honoured Member" of the Manitoba Hockey Hall of Famepointss

References

External links

Del Topoll’s biography at Manitoba Hockey Hall of Fame

1933 births
Living people
Canadian ice hockey centres
Ice hockey people from Manitoba
Brandon Wheat Kings players